The Bridge between Monroe and Penn Townships, also known as the Penns Creek Bridge, Camelback Bridge, or Camelback, was a historic bridge located at Monroe Township and Penn Township near Selinsgrove in Snyder County, Pennsylvania. It was a  barrel arch bridge built in 1919.  It spanned Penns Creek.  It was removed in 1994.

It was listed on the National Register of Historic Places in 1988.

Gallery

See also 
 List of bridges documented by the Historic American Engineering Record in Pennsylvania
 National Register of Historic Places listings in Snyder County, Pennsylvania

References

External links

Bridges in Snyder County, Pennsylvania
Road bridges on the National Register of Historic Places in Pennsylvania
Bridges completed in 1919
Historic American Engineering Record in Pennsylvania
National Register of Historic Places in Snyder County, Pennsylvania
Arch bridges in the United States